Dendrolycosa is a genus of nursery web spiders that was first described by Carl Ludwig Doleschall in 1859.

Species
 it contains seventeen species, found only in Oceania, Africa, and Asia:
Dendrolycosa bairdi Jäger, 2011 – Laos
Dendrolycosa bobbiliensis (Reddy & Patel, 1993) – India
Dendrolycosa cruciata (Roewer, 1955) – Tanzania
Dendrolycosa duckitti Jäger, 2011 – Laos, Indonesia (Sumatra)
Dendrolycosa fusca Doleschall, 1859 (type) – Indonesia (Ambon)
Dendrolycosa gitae (Tikader, 1970) – India (mainland, Andaman Is.)
Dendrolycosa icadia (L. Koch, 1876) – Australia (Queensland)
Dendrolycosa kakadu Raven & Hebron, 2018 – Australia (Northern Territory)
Dendrolycosa lepida (Thorell, 1890) – Indonesia (Sumatra)
Dendrolycosa ornata (Berland, 1924) – New Caledonia
Dendrolycosa parangbusta (Barrion & Litsinger, 1995) – Philippines
Dendrolycosa putiana (Barrion & Litsinger, 1995) – Philippines
Dendrolycosa robusta (Thorell, 1895) – China, Myanmar, Laos, Vietnam
Dendrolycosa rossi Silva & Griswold, 2013 – Madagascar
Dendrolycosa sierwaldae Jäger, 2011 – New Guinea
Dendrolycosa songi (Zhang, 2000) – China
Dendrolycosa yuka Jäger, 2011 – South Africa

See also
 List of Pisauridae species

References

Araneomorphae genera
Pisauridae
Spiders of Africa
Spiders of Asia
Spiders of Australia